The 1924 Colorado gubernatorial election was held on November 4, 1924. Republican nominee Clarence Morley defeated Democratic incumbent William Ellery Sweet with 51.92% of the vote.

Primary elections
Primary elections were held on September 9, 1924.

Democratic primary

Candidates
William Ellery Sweet, incumbent Governor

Results

Republican primary

Candidates
Clarence Morley, Denver District Court Judge 
Robert F. Rockwell, incumbent Lieutenant Governor
Earl Cooley, former Lieutenant Governor

Results

General election

Candidates
Major party candidates
Clarence Morley, Republican
William Ellery Sweet, Democratic

Other candidates
Frank Cass, Farmer–Labor 
William R. Dietrich, Workers
Louis E. Leeder, Independent

Results

References

1924
Colorado
Gubernatorial